Flavio Junior Bianchi (born 24 January 2000) is an Italian professional footballer who plays as a forward for Serie B club Brescia, on loan from Genoa.

Club career
He made his debut for the senior squad of Genoa on 13 August 2021 in a Coppa Italia game against Perugia. He made his Serie A debut for Genoa on 21 August 2021 in a game against Inter Milan. He substituted Hernani at half-time of a 0–4 away loss. He made his first start on 2 October 2021 against Salernitana. On 5 November 2021, he scored his first Serie A goal in Empoli-Genoa 2-2 at the 89'.

On 28 January 2022, he joined Serie B club Brescia on loan.

International career
He was first called up to represent Italy in 2015 for under-15 friendlies.

He was on the Italy's squad at the 2017 UEFA European Under-17 Championship and made one appearance, Italy did not advance from the group stage.

Personal life 
Born in Asti, he grew up in Diano Marina.

References

External links
 

2000 births
People from Asti
Footballers from Piedmont
Living people
Italian footballers
Italy youth international footballers
Association football forwards
Genoa C.F.C. players
Lucchese 1905 players
Brescia Calcio players
Serie A players
Serie B players
Serie C players
Sportspeople from the Province of Asti